Miss USA 1980 was the 29th Miss USA pageant, televised live on May 15 from the Gulf Coast Convention Center in Biloxi, Mississippi on CBS.

The pageant was won by Shawn Weatherly of South Carolina, who was crowned by outgoing titleholder Mary Therese Friel of New York. Weatherly would later win the Miss Universe 1980 pageant, and first runner-up Jineane Ford of Arizona inherited the Miss USA title for the remainder of the year. Weatherly later became an actress, featured in the television series Baywatch.

Results

Placements

∞ Weatherly won Miss Universe 1980. Due to protocol, Weatherly resigns her title as Miss USA 1980. 1st runner-up, Jineane Ford, replaces her as Miss USA.

Semifinal scores

Preliminary swimsuit scores
The following is the contestants average scores in the Preliminary swimsuit competition.

Special awards

Historical significance 
 South Carolina wins competition for the second time. Incidentally, Weatherly  went on to become the fifth woman from the USA to win the Miss Universe title in 1980.
 Arizona earns the 1st runner-up position for the second time. The last time it placed this was in 1965. Besides it became the 20th state who wins the Miss USA title for the first time. She finished as 1st runner-up, but succeeded as Miss USA 1980 after Shawn Weatherly became Miss Universe. 
 Florida earns the 2nd runner-up position for the third time. The last time it placed this was in 1967.
 Alabama earns the 3rd runner-up position for the first time.
 Kentucky earns the 4th runner-up position for the third time. The last time it placed this was in 1971.
 States that placed in semifinals the previous year were Arizona, New York and Texas.
 Texas placed for the sixth consecutive year.
 Arizona and New York made their second consecutive placement.
 Florida and New Mexico last placed in 1978.
 Minnesota last placed in 1977.
 South Carolina last placed in 1976.
 Alabama and Kentucky last placed in 1975.
 Maryland and Nebraska last placed in 1973.
 New Hampshire last placed in 1962.
 Massachusetts breaks an ongoing streak of placements since 1978.
 Hawaii and Virginia break an ongoing streak of placements since 1977.
 California breaks an ongoing streak of placements since 1957.

Delegates
The Miss USA 1980 delegates were:

 Alabama - Pamela Rigas
 Alaska - Debby Fickus
 Arizona - Jineane Ford
 Arkansas - Susie Owens
 California - Kari Lloyd
 Colorado - Shelley Marks
 Connecticut - Kristine Wilson
 Delaware - Karen Giobbe
 District of Columbia - Marianne Ritter
 Florida - Barbara Bowser
 Georgia - April Reid
 Hawaii - Carol Ching
 Idaho - Marta Vincen
 Illinois - Karen Marie Groat
 Indiana - Susan Osby
 Iowa - Lori Kromminga
 Kansas - Lisa Boyd
 Kentucky - Lisa Devillez
 Louisiana - Kelly Bonin
 Maine - Victoria Elias
 Maryland - Tonja Walker
 Massachusetts - Diane Campbell
 Michigan - Teena Hammonds
 Minnesota - Carla Reid Peterson
 Mississippi - Cheri Brown
 Missouri - Kelly Laxon
 Montana - Robbin English
 Nebraska - Rebecca Staab
 Nevada - Kimberlee Guider
 New Hampshire - Eva Dyer
 New Jersey - Joni Peifer
 New Mexico - Kathy Dawn Patrick
 New York - Debra Sue Maurice
 North Carolina - Lori Boggs
 North Dakota - Kim Thompson
 Ohio - Elizabeth Kim Thomas
 Oklahoma - Martha Streightoff
 Oregon - Martha Viducich
 Pennsylvania - Andrea Patrick
 Rhode Island - Robyn Hall
 South Carolina - Shawn Weatherly
 South Dakota - Jane Schmidt
 Tennessee - Diane Hunt
 Texas - Barbara Buckley
 Utah - Tamara Parsons
 Vermont - Judi Mason
 Virginia - Kelly Humphrey
 Washington - Janet Brown
 West Virginia - Linda Hendrick
 Wisconsin - Susan McGaffigan
 Wyoming - Suzie Harris

Judges
Judi Andersen
Gerald Fitzgerald
Anita Gillette
Peter Max
Bob Kane
Richard Kline
Joan Prather
Rosie Vela
Adam West

External links 
 Miss USA official website

1980
May 1980 events in the United States
1980 beauty pageants
1980 in Mississippi